Events from the year 1999 in Sweden

Incumbents
 Monarch – Carl XVI Gustaf
 Prime Minister – Göran Persson

Events

May
 28 May -  The Malexander murders.
 29 May - Charlotte Nillson Wins Eurovision Song Contest.

Popular culture

Sports 
 The 1999 Allsvenskan was won by Helsingborgs IF

Film
1 October – Tsatsiki, morsan och polisen, directed by Ella Lemhagen, released

Births
21 January – Pontus Dahlberg, footballer

Deaths

15 January – Lars Glasser, sprint canoer, world champion (born 1925).
29 April – Oscar Ljung, film actor (born 1909)
28 May – Henry Carlsson, footballer (born 1917).
13 June – Kjell Rosén, footballer (born 1921)
8 September – Birgit Cullberg, choreographer (born 1908)
12 November – Sven Hjertsson, footballer (born 1924).

See also
 1999 in Swedish television

References

 
Years of the 20th century in Sweden
Sweden
1990s in Sweden
Sweden